Boano (also called Bolano) is a Sulawesi language of the Austronesian family.

Boano is spoken in the single village of Bolano. Boano speakers are surrounded by speakers of the Tialo language, who live along the coast between Tingkulang (Tomini) and Moutong.

References

Tomini–Tolitoli languages
Languages of Sulawesi